Tomer Peretz (born 1982) is a Los Angeles-based Israeli conceptual artist and painter. An artist since his early childhood in Jerusalem, Peretz utilizes a spectrum of platforms, including oil and acrylic painting, photography, and conceptual art, to express his unique and contemporary point of view. With an appreciation for realism, surrealism and the unknown, his breadth of work spans across contemporary and figurative art. Every piece highlights an underlying theme, element of mystery and more than meets the eye. Peretz does not paint in vain, a traveler and spiritual wanderer, his work is inspired by stories and people that have impacted his life and spirit as he captures his subjects in a raw and candid light. A passionate philanthropist and visionary, his art and installations serve to highlight his passions and beliefs and have helped raise money for philanthropic causes he strongly resonates with.

Professional career 
Peretz is currently represented by the reputable gallerist Giancarlo Pedrazzini in the 'Fabbrica Eos' gallery in Milan, Italy. 
Peretz's artwork has been showcased in galleries in Los Angeles, Las Vegas, Israel and throughout Europe.
Peretz's work includes controversial issues regarding Middle East affairs and specifically the Israeli–Palestinian conflict; depicting  his own personal experience as an officer serving in the Israel Defense Forces.
In 2014, Peretz was awarded the inaugural Arthur Szyk Prize for Disruptive Thought. Peretz's art has been showcased at Art Basel, Miami. His 2012 opening exhibition "Unbreakable" featured 25 large-scale paintings and collected artifacts at the Bruce Lurie Gallery in Culver City, Calif. Peretz has received many private portrait commissions from A-list celebrities across the globe and custom requests from some of the entertainment industry's top artists. Peretz's work has been displayed in multiple shows, including "It's Halloween at Very Venice Art and Design Gallery" in October 2011; "For the Love of Art" at Tokyo Ice in December 2009; and "Amit Apel Design Studio Gallery Opening" in Los Angeles in May 2009. 

His work was also featured at a benefit in partnership with another organization where 100% of the proceeds were given to a charity for children with cancer and their families at Beit Haitonaim.

In December 2019 Tomer painted the logo for the Venice,California based film company; 'Concordia studio' and is featured creating it in the beginning of every movie. The studio is backed by Billionaire Laurene Powell Jobs alongside Oscar-winning director Davis Guggenheim. One of Concordia studio's films is "Kailash", which was honored at the Sundance Film Festival.

As a way to honor and celebrate the sacrifices healthcare workers and their families endure during the COVID-19 crisis,  the Israeli American Council generously gifted Peretz's 'Hero' to the Albert Einstein College of Medicine and Montefiore Medical Center. In this monochromatic painting, Peretz portrays a healthcare worker during the COVID-19 pandemic in honor of Montefiore's healthcare heroes.

15 Minutes 
On April 18, 2020 Tomer Peretz began a new body of work through the Instagram Live platform. World leaders had recently enforced "Safer at Home" policies in order to slow down the rapid spread of COVID-19 also known as coronavirus.  Many people felt isolated and became restless because of the order. In an attempt to uplift his community, Peretz invited his followers into his studio (through social media) to join him in his latest artistic challenge. The objective was to have a conversation with his friends (often celebrities) as he painted their portrait onto a 10 foot canvas -  all within a 15 Minute timeframe. I was a fun but difficult painting challenge, giving viewers an entertaining visual and unique glimpse into the private lives of his guests.  Peretz has collaborated with Gene Simmons of KISS, Jonathan Davis of Korn, Dotstolines, Inbar Lavi, Karim Rashid, Alejandro Edda, Magnus Walker, and many more well-renowned artists.

Welcome To America 
In June 2021, Tomer introduced a thought-provoking art exhibition about society and reality of the world we live in today. The exhibition has currently held 2 volumes and is now in the works for volume 3. Welcome to America volume 1 was an 11,000 sq ft two part show featuring original artworks, installations, and performances in the heart of Downtown LA. The show began on the first floor where guests were viewing Tomer's collection inspired through his years of living in America to then experience the unanticipated on the second floor. Materiality today is shown through the eyes of the artist where guests unexpectedly were apart of a shocking, provocative, mind-blowing live performance. 

Welcome to America Volume 2 was an exclusive art show by artist Tomer Peretz where he showcased his most recent work ("Welcome to America" and "Incomplete"). The paintings displayed in the gallery involve emotional power through conceptual experiences, and Peretz's views on society. Follow his journey as he evolves from an underground artist with just a passion for paint to his launch to go public. With an appreciation for realism, surrealism, and the unknown, his breadth of work spans across contemporary and performance art. Every piece highlights an underlying theme of elements of mystery and his search for the profound.

NFT Career 
In 2022 Tomer Peretz became erudite in the NFT industry and is one of the very few traditional artists to merge his physical art with digital art. Tomer quickly saw the potential and benefits of buying digital art but was sure to incorporate his true talent, painting. He then became heavily involved in the platforms, events, collections and collaborations. Tomer moves with the world of art as the times evolve around him.

In March 2022 Tomer dropped his first NFT Collection called “Gonna Make Some Bad Choices Tonight”. With a huge success of 252 editions that were released in less than a week, Tomer was eager to introduce his perspective on the industry in his own unique way. Tomer created a community for his art that allowed members to have access to exclusive shows, pieces and more! Along with his NFT drop, he had a private show at his very own Downtown Los Angeles gallery that over 500 members showed. Only those who were holders of the Gonna Make Some Bad Choices Tonight NFT had access to a secret showing on the 4th floor of his building. Members and guests were left with only thoughts and interest in Tomer’s next big debut!

In May 2022, Tomer dropped his second NFT called “Facing Bad Choices” where he sold all 4 of his pieces on Opensea in less than 5 minutes. The inspiration stems from his success from his first NFT drop and inspired him to make “Facing Bad Choices”. In June 2022, Tomer collaborated with artists, Val Kilmer and Laurence Fuller for his third NFT drop called “My Number”. This unique piece was created amongst three incredible artists on Superare and is going for 10 ETH. Also in June 2022, along with his third NFT he dropped his fourth NFT on Opensea called “Bad Choices”. There are 31 pieces of this NFT sold for 0.19 ETH. Tomer is no stranger to art and its alternative capabilities, he is fathomed by the millions of unique forms art portrays and is not only accepting of them but adaptive.

References

https://www.wonderlandmagazine.com/2022/07/18/tomer-peretz-val-kilmer-net/
https://mundanemag.com/tomer-peretz-releases-new-nft-project-bad-choices/
https://medium.com/@tokenjournalism/for-tomer-peretz-bad-choices-in-life-imitates-art-96381904ec36
https://israeru.jp/culture/art/tomerperetz-interview-vol1/
https://issuu.com/timespub/docs/ladtnews-083021
http://issuu.com/bluebeegallery/docs/bbm-issue2-r06/34
http://voyagela.com/interview/meet-tomer-peretz-tomer-peretz-west-adams/
https://nohoartsdistrict.com/north-hollywood-news-noho/item/6560-meet-artist-tomer-peretz

External links 
Official website 
Voyage LA Article
Streetlight Magazine Article
Artmoire Artist Interview
https://www.wonderlandmagazine.com/2022/07/18/tomer-peretz-val-kilmer-net/
https://mundanemag.com/tomer-peretz-releases-new-nft-project-bad-choices/
https://medium.com/@tokenjournalism/for-tomer-peretz-bad-choices-in-life-imitates-art-96381904ec36
https://israeru.jp/culture/art/tomerperetz-interview-vol1/

1982 births
Living people
Artists from Los Angeles
Israeli Sephardi Jews
Israeli Mizrahi Jews